The Time Lords are a fictional ancient race of extraterrestrial people in the British science fiction television series Doctor Who, of which the series' main protagonist, the Doctor, is a member. Time Lords are so named for their command of time travel technology and their non-linear perception of time. Originally, they were described as a powerful and wise race from the planet Gallifrey, from which the Doctor was a renegade; details beyond this were very limited for the first decade of the series. They later became integral to many episodes and stories as their role in the universe developed. For the first eight years after the series resumed in 2005, the Time Lords were said to have been destroyed  during the Last Great Time War at some point in the show's continuity between the original series' cancellation in 1989 and the show's revival. In 2013, the 50th anniversary special "The Day of the Doctor" concerned this supposed destruction and their eventual survival.

They developed a culture of custodianship and time-related technologies based on this perception which includes strictly controlled space/time travel machines (known as "TARDISes") and monitoring devices to travel through time and to prevent time from being subverted or abused—although actual action was described as rare in practice due to their  traditional policy of strict non-interference and neutrality. They can act to manipulate timelines of a wide range of events and individuals, so long as they do not cross back into their own timeline. Over subsequent episodes their history, their development of time manipulation, and their internal politics were touched upon, with Time Lord society portrayed as a stagnated ceremony-bound oligarchy and their past having descended into myth and legend. The Doctor became at times an ally, being appointed their president during his fourth, fifth, and twelfth incarnations and assisting them on many other occasions.

Creation
In an audio commentary recorded for the 2009 DVD release of The War Games (1969), producer Derrick Sherwin mentioned how in a discussion with the serial's co-writer Terrance Dicks the previous day, Dicks was "absolutely certain" that Sherwin created the Time Lords for the serial, although Sherwin could not remember himself. Later in the commentary, Dicks recalled Sherwin telling him in the discussions with Dicks and Dicks' fellow co-writer Malcolm Hulke that because the Doctor had always been established as being on the run from his own people, that if he has to appeal to them, the Doctor would be in trouble. In a 2016 interview with The Essential Doctor Who magazine, Dicks mentioned how when Sherwin and he were discussing The War Games one day, Sherwin said, "He belongs to this mysterious race called the Time Lords, doesn't he?" with "everything" ultimately coming from that discussion. In The War Games DVD commentary, Sherwin mentioned that he recalled hearing about the Time Lords at the beginning of the series, but as no one else remembered this, it "might have come out of [his] dreams".

Elaborating on this genesis in a 2014 interview in Doctor Who Magazine, Sherwin said of The War Games, "It was a case of what shall we do, how can we end this? Let's go back to the beginning and say [the Doctor] was a Time Lord, a renegade Time Lord, a pain in the arse for the other Time Lords who stole his TARDIS and buggered off around the universe. So if he's going to be called to book let's bring in the Time Lords."

Overview
Early on in the series, the Doctor was identified as a human being; however, his home planet, which from the start of the series is explicitly established as not being Earth, was not named. In The War Games (1969), the Doctor's people appeared, who from then on are known as a race called Time Lords, and in Spearhead from Space (1970), the Doctor's earlier description of himself as a human is retconned when the Third Doctor explicitly states that he is not human. In The Time Warrior (1973–74), the name of the Doctor's home planet, Gallifrey, was revealed on screen for the first time. The nature and history of the Time Lords were gradually revealed as the television programme progressed.

The Time Lords are considered one of the oldest and most technologically powerful races in the Doctor Who universe. In The Time Warrior, the Time Lords are characterised by Sontaran military intelligence, quoted by Commander Linx, as "A race of great technical achievement, but lacking the morale to withstand a determined assault." The Tenth Doctor says in "The Sound of Drums" (2007) that they are "the oldest and most mighty race in the universe". In "The Witch's Familiar" (2015), Davros mentions a prophecy on the Doctor's world that spoke of a hybrid made up of "two great warrior races forced together to create a warrior greater than either", which is "half-Dalek, half-Time Lord", while in "Hell Bent" (2015), the General, while describing the prophecy of the Hybrid, mentions the Time Lords as one of two warrior races along with the Daleks. In "Before the Flood" (2015), the Fisher King describes the Time Lords as "Cowardly, vain curators, who suddenly remembered they had teeth, and became the most warlike race in the galaxy." In the very distant past, the Time Lords fought a genocidal war against the Great Vampires, which led to such a catastrophic loss of life that the Time Lords renounced violence. In The War Games, the Second Doctor mentions that the Time Lords' "great powers" are hardly ever used due to their policy of non-intervention into the affairs of other planets, and that they instead observe and gather knowledge. Because of this, holding a trial is a "very rare" event for the Time Lords. Exceptions to this policy are made only in extreme circumstances when they feel they have to, such as where the Doctor calls them for help in the serial.

At the start of the 2005 television series, Gallifrey was thought to have been destroyed and the Time Lords functionally extinct as a result of a mutually destructive Time War with the Dalek race; the Ninth Doctor describes his planet as "just rocks and dust" in "The End of the World" (2005), and mentions in "Dalek" (2005) that the Time Lords "burnt" with the Daleks at the end of the "Last Great Time War", and the Tenth Doctor tells the Master in "The Sound of Drums" (2007) that the Time Lords are "dead" and "[a]ll [they've] got is each other." The Doctor describes himself as the last of his kind and says his planet burned on numerous other occasions, as do other individuals, such as the Krillitane Mr Finch in "School Reunion" (2006).

In "Father's Day" (2005), the Ninth Doctor remarks that before Time Lords were "all gone", they would have prevented or repaired paradoxes such as that which attracted the Reapers to 1987 Earth.

In "Rise of the Cybermen" (2006), the Tenth Doctor mentions, "When the Time Lords kept their eye on everything, you could pop between realities, home in time for tea. Then they died, and took it all with them. Walls of reality closed, the worlds were sealed. Everything became that bit less kind." In "The Satan Pit" (2006), the Tenth Doctor states that his people "practically invented black holes. Well, in fact, they did." Both the Beast (in "The Satan Pit") and the Doctor (in "The Sound of Drums" and "The Doctor's Wife", 2011) believe the Doctor ended the War by killing all of the Time Lords and many of the Daleks.

The Tenth Doctor's artificially created "daughter" Jenny is speculated by Donna Noble in "The Doctor's Daughter" (2008) to be a surviving Time Lord, though the Doctor initially rejects the suggestion.

Two other Time Lord-like beings appeared in "Journey's End" (2008): Donna, briefly empowered with the mind and knowledge of a Time Lord, and a half-human clone of the Tenth Doctor. Donna's memories related to the Doctor, as well as her Time Lord knowledge, are buried in order to save her life, while the clone lives out his existence in a parallel universe with Rose Tyler.

"The End of Time" (2009–10) shows the High Council of Time Lords, led by Lord President Rassilon, attempting to escape the Time War by materialising Gallifrey in the place of Earth at Christmas. However, the Tenth Doctor destroys the device which allows their passage into the present, sending them back into the events of the Time War.

During the episode "The Doctor's Wife" it is revealed that several Time Lords and their TARDISes had been trapped and destroyed by an entity called House who lived in a separate bubble universe.

In "A Good Man Goes to War" (2011), it is revealed that the daughter of Amy Pond and Rory Williams, Melody Pond (who later goes by her transliterated name "River Song"), has been born with Time Lord-like genetic traits. An old acquaintance of the Doctor's, Madame Vastra, reminds the Doctor that the Time Lord race developed due to their billions of years' exposure to the time vortex. The Doctor then recalls that Rory and Amy had spent their wedding night in the TARDIS; therefore it is theorised by Vastra that River's conception mirrored that of the Time Lords' genesis and therefore she herself developed Time Lord genetic characteristics.

In "The Night of the Doctor" (2013), it is shown that the Eighth Doctor regenerates into the War Doctor to fight in the Time War. Many years later, as shown during "The Day of the Doctor" (2013) and also described by the Partisan in "The End of Time", the War Doctor originally planned to use a Time Lord weapon known as the Moment to destroy the Time Lords and Daleks. However, after being shown the Tenth and Eleventh Doctors during "The Day of the Doctor", he works together with them to change the assumed outcome of the Time War: thirteen incarnations of the Doctor team up together to freeze Gallifrey in time and place it outside of their universe (protecting it and the remaining Time Lords), while the Daleks destroy themselves in their own crossfire once Gallifrey is gone. The War Doctor does not retain the memory of these events and the Doctor spends centuries believing he burnt Gallifrey until the Eleventh Doctor's time; this is because the time streams are out of sync after the War Doctor meets his future selves and the altered events are only known to the Doctor once they occur in the Eleventh Doctor's experience and become part of his memory. Indeed, earlier on in the episode, both the Tenth and the Eleventh Doctors mistakenly believe that the War Doctor killed all of the Time Lords on the last day of the Time War. After being informed that the plan to save Gallifrey was successful, the Eleventh Doctor sets out to find Gallifrey and restore the Time Lords.

In "The Time of the Doctor", the Doctor visits the planet Trenzalore where he discovers a question being broadcast through all of time and space through a crack in the universe: "Doctor Who?" The Doctor realizes that the Time Lords are attempting to return to the universe and will come back if he speaks his true name. Due to "half the universe" surrounding Trenzalore, a siege begins that lasts centuries as the Doctor knows that if the Time Lords return, the Time War will begin anew. With the Doctor on the verge of death, Clara Oswald pleads with the Time Lords through the crack to intervene and save the Doctor. Through the crack, the Time Lords grant the Doctor a new regeneration cycle, saving his life before sealing the crack again.

In "Hell Bent" (2015), it is revealed that Gallifrey returned to the universe around the time of its end. After escaping his confession dial in "Heaven Sent" (2015), still furious over the death of Clara Oswald in "Face the Raven" (2015), the Doctor manages to depose Rassilon—who had put the Doctor there to begin with for questioning—and exile him in "Hell Bent" before running off again.

Physical characteristics

Time Lords and human beings look alike, however they differ in many respects. Physiological differences from humans include two hearts which normally beat at 170 beats per minute, three brain stems [S10E06 Extremis], an internal body temperature of 15 degrees Celsius (59 degrees Fahrenheit)  and a "respiratory bypass system" that allows them to survive strangulation. The Twelfth Doctor was able to survive direct exposure to the vacuum of space in "Oxygen". Time Lords also seem to have an increased resilience to higher frequencies of sound, as seen in "The Christmas Invasion" and "Partners in Crime". If severely injured, Time Lords can go into a healing coma which lowers their body temperature to below freezing which the Doctor did in Planet of the Daleks. In the serial Destiny of the Daleks, Romana was able to voluntarily stop both of her hearts beating, to fool the Daleks into believing that she was dead. The Doctor also shows a greater tolerance to cold compared to humans in The Seeds of Doom and "Planet of the Ood" and even Romana in The Ribos Operation, and in "42", the Tenth Doctor states he is able to survive at absolute zero for a short period of time. In "World War Three", the Doctor is able to shake off an electrocution attempt which is fatal to a number of humans, and appears unaffected by the energy whip wielded by the Sycorax in "The Christmas Invasion". In "Smith and Jones" the Tenth Doctor says that the radiation given off by X-rays pose no real threat to Time Lords, and proceeds to absorb an amount that would be lethal to a human, which he subsequently expels through his foot. "The End of Time" shows the Tenth Doctor as being capable of surviving (for a short period) a massive burst of radiation that would have killed anything else instantly. However, the radiation burst caused enough damage to start a regeneration.

Time Lords are extremely long-lived, routinely counting their ages in terms of centuries; the Second Doctor claimed in The War Games that Time Lords could live "practically forever, barring accidents." The series has suggested that Time Lords have a different concept of ageing from humans. In Pyramids of Mars, the Fourth Doctor considers an age of 750 years to be "middle-aged". In "The Stolen Earth", the Tenth Doctor refers to when his original incarnation was a "kid" at 90 years old. However, within a specific incarnation, a Time Lord is able to age, albeit much more slowly than a human. The War Doctor and Eleventh Doctor, over the course of the Last Great Time War and the Battle of Trenzalore, respectively, are seen to age within their respective incarnations to what would appear to a human to be old age; both conflicts are suggested within the series to last hundreds if not thousands of Earth years.

In The Daleks' Master Plan, the First Doctor is able to resist the effects of the Time Destructor better than his companions, who are visibly aged by it; one of them, Sara Kingdom, ages to dust before the Destructor device can be reversed. The Fourth Doctor is briefly aged 500 years in The Leisure Hive, leaving him an old man but still active. A similar situation occurred in "The Sound of Drums", where the Master uses specially made technology to age the Tenth Doctor by a century, leaving him in a frail and helpless state. A further application of this technology in the following episode, "Last of the Time Lords", suspends the Doctor's capacity to regenerate, showing the effects of 900 years of life without regeneration.

In The Two Doctors, the Second Doctor states that the "Rassilon Imprimatur" allows Time Lords to safely travel through time, becoming symbionts with their TARDISes, and that the reason other species are incapable of developing time travel is that they lack the imprimatur. However, he implies later that he was lying about at least some of this information to mislead the Sontarans. At the beginning of The Trial of a Time Lord, the Sixth Doctor suggests that a number of elder Time Lords were able to use their combined mental energy to summon his TARDIS against his will.

Time Lords can survive, but not function properly, without two hearts. In "The Shakespeare Code", the Tenth Doctor has only one heart working. He knows this and tries and fails to stand up, until both of them start working again. Also, in "The Power of Three", after a massive electric current is passed through the Eleventh Doctor, he is left with only one heart in working condition and is unable to carry on for a long period of time.

In "The Unicorn and the Wasp", the Tenth Doctor is able to overcome the effects of cyanide by "stimulating the inhibited enzymes into reversal", a process he referred to as going through "detox".

In the episode "Cold Blood", the Eleventh Doctor experiences excruciating pain when the Silurian attempts to decontaminate him of surface bacteria. The Doctor states this would kill him, most likely due to the scanners being programmed to "detox" humans and therefore being unaware of what elements the Doctor requires.

A Time Lord is able to conceal their Time Lord nature, and become a human, by using the Chameleon Arch – a device that stores their "essence" and memories in an innocuous device such as a fob watch, and replaces them with false counterparts until the object is later re-opened. The process allows them to disguise themselves as humans physiologically and psychologically, meaning they only have one heart and are stripped of non-human powers, and of any memory of having been a Time Lord. This story element was notably featured in Series 3; the Doctor uses it to hide himself from the Family of Blood and becomes a schoolteacher in Edwardian England. His nemesis the Master used it to disguise himself as a human to escape the Time War. The story element is later revisited in the Series 12 episode "Fugitive of the Judoon" when a mysterious, unknown incarnation of the Doctor (played by Jo Martin), is revealed to have been hiding on Earth as a tour guide named “Ruth Clayton” using a Chameleon Arch.

Mental powers
Time Lords can communicate by telepathy, and can link their minds to share information and enhance their powers. In Castrovalva, the Doctor activates the TARDIS' Zero Room mentally. Additionally, both the Doctor and the Master demonstrate significant hypnotic abilities which may be supplemented by their telepathic abilities.

These powers were elaborated upon from 2005. The Eleventh Doctor is seen using this method to query a cat about the goings-on of the flat in "The Lodger". In "A Good Man Goes to War"  and "Closing Time"  he is apparently able to even understand babies, as well as horses in "A Town Called Mercy". In "The Girl in the Fireplace", the Tenth Doctor reads the mind of Madame de Pompadour—and in the process, to his surprise, she is able to read his mind as well. In Paul Cornell's Virgin New Adventures novel Love and War, the Doctor uses a similar method to read the mind of his companion Bernice Summerfield. In "The End of Time", the Master uses the same technique, allowing the Tenth Doctor to hear the drumming sound the Master constantly hears. The Doctor later displays his telepathic communion powers in "Fear Her"  and in "The Shakespeare Code", where by using his mind melding technique he is partially able to relieve a man of his mental illness as he traces back through his memories. In "Planet of the Ood", the Tenth Doctor seems able to temporarily confer some degree of telepathy on his companion Donna Noble, so that she can hear the telepathic song of the Ood. When she is unable to bear the song, the Doctor removes the ability. This telepathic ability is also extended to other alien species to some extent. In the same episode, he is able to "hear" the Ood's telepathic song where the humans could not.

In "The Lodger", the Eleventh Doctor (pressed for time and needing to convey a great deal of information to someone) smashed his forehead into another person's forehead, causing a massive instantaneous transfer of information. He then commented that was just the general background, then repeats the action to transfer further information pertinent to the episode.

The Doctor also contacts the Time Lords by going into a trance and creating an assembling box in The War Games. In The Two Doctors, the Doctor engages in astral projection, but warns that if he is disturbed while doing so, his mind could become severed from his body and he could die. In "Last of the Time Lords", the Doctor telepathically interfaces with a network tapped into the human population who collectively chant his name. The focus of psychic energy granted the Doctor the ability to de-age himself, float through the air, deflect shots from the Master's laser screwdriver, and telekinetically disarm the Master.

In addition, Time Lords may be clairvoyant, or have additional time-related senses. In The Time Monster, and Invasion of the Dinosaurs, the Third Doctor is able to resist fields of slow time, being able to move through them even though others are paralysed. In City of Death, both the Fourth Doctor and Romana notice distortions and jumps in time that no one else does. In the 2010 episode "The Lodger", the Eleventh Doctor is the only one to notice (and remain free of) the time loops caused by the activation of the Time Engine.

In the 2005 series, the Ninth Doctor claims that he can sense the movement of the Earth through space as well as being able to perceive the past and all possible futures. He is also able to concentrate and time his motions well enough to step safely through the blades of a rapidly spinning fan, and later claims that if any Time Lords still existed, he would be able to sense them. As the Tenth Doctor he repeats this assertion, adding also that he is somehow innately able to sense which events in time are 'fixed' and which are in 'flux'. The Eleventh Doctor slightly amends what was said earlier in "The Doctor's Wife", saying that he could only sense if there were other Time Lords in this universe. In the original series episode Warriors' Gate, Romana is called a 'time-sensitive' by a marauding slaver and, though she seems to deny this, is able to interface with his spaceship in ways that only a 'time-sensitive' is supposed to be able to. In "Utopia", the Tenth Doctor states that he finds it difficult to look at Captain Jack Harkness because Jack's existence has become fixed in time and space.

In the Series 4 episode "Journey's End", the Tenth Doctor was shown to use his telepathic abilities to wipe Donna Noble's mind of certain memories, specifically the memories of her travels in the TARDIS and to 'implant' a defence mechanism which is activated in "The End of Time". The War Games  showed that other Time Lords are also able to erase people's memories, as in that story, Jamie and Zoe's travels with the Doctor were erased from their memory, and the council of Time Lords also put a memory block on the Doctor so he could not pilot the TARDIS. In the Series 5 episode "The Big Bang"  the Doctor telepathically left a message in Amy Pond's head before sealing her into the Pandorica so that she would know what was happening when she woke up.

Time Lords, or at least the Doctor, can read extremely quickly.

Regeneration

Time Lords also have the ability to regenerate their bodies when their current body is mortally wounded. This process results in their body undergoing a transformation, gaining a new physical form and a new personality; a Time Lord who was pleasant and polite in his previous regeneration might express surprise when his new form turns out to be prone to saying rude things. 

Regenerations can be traumatic. In Castrovalva, the Fifth Doctor requires the use of a Zero Room, a chamber shielded from the outside universe that provides an area of calm for him to recuperate. He comments that there is an excellent polygonal zero room beneath the junior senate block on Gallifrey. The Time Lord's personality also sometimes goes through a period of instability following a regeneration.

It was first stated in The Deadly Assassin that a Time Lord can regenerate twelve times (thirteen incarnations in all). There were exceptions to this rule, however: when the Master reached the end of his regenerative cycle, he took possession of the body of another person to continue living. In The Five Doctors, the Master was offered a new cycle of regenerations by the High Council to save the Doctor from the Death Zone, which may indicate that there are methods to circumvent the twelve regeneration limit. The Master says in "The Sound of Drums"  that the Time Lords "resurrected" him to fight in the Time War. It was revealed in The Brain of Morbius  that the Time Lords also use the Elixir of Life in extreme cases, where regeneration is not possible. It is confirmed in "The Time of the Doctor"  that a Time Lord can normally regenerate only twelve times but that the Time Lords have the ability to grant more regenerations: at the behest of Clara Oswald they granted the Doctor himself a new cycle when he was at the point of death from old age, having used up his entire cycle.

Also in The Deadly Assassin, several Time Lords including the President are stated to have been "murdered" and are not stated to have regenerated.

Regeneration, regardless of how many regenerations the individual Time Lord has already undergone, is a conditional and non-inevitable phenomenon. This is stated in "The End of Time" when the Tenth Doctor explains to Wilfred Mott that a Time Lord can die before they have a chance to regenerate, in which case they die outright. In The Deadly Assassin at least one of the murders was carried out with a 'staser', possibly a weapon designed to both kill and prevent regeneration (stasers are also stated to have little effect on non-living tissue). In the Series 4 episode "Turn Left", the Tenth Doctor's body is shown on a stretcher following the parallel events of "The Runaway Bride". A UNIT officer states that the Doctor's death must have been too quick to allow for regeneration.

In Destiny of the Daleks, Romana showed the ability to rapidly change form several times in a row during her first regeneration, and apparently had the ability to change into whatever appearance she desired. When the Doctor remarks upon her ability, she comments that he should have stayed in university. However, despite showing several appearances, Romana regenerated only once on that occasion.

In "Utopia", the Master, just before regeneration, claimed that he would become "young and strong", implying that he could choose the form of his new body. The human-Time Lord hybrid River Song in "Let's Kill Hitler" claimed she was "focusing on a dress size", but subsequently weighed herself, seeming unsure of how her new body had truly developed. The Doctor said on several occasions he wished he was "ginger", which he has seemed unable to control in previous regenerations. In "Last of the Time Lords", when the Master is fatally wounded, he chooses not to regenerate, essentially committing suicide rather than regenerate and be kept prisoner by the Doctor forever. This again implies that regeneration is not inevitable and can indeed be refused.

Upon encountering the remains of fellow Time Lord the Corsair in "The Doctor's Wife", the Doctor refers to the Corsair as both male and female, hinting that Time Lords can switch genders upon their regenerations; this is confirmed in "Dark Water", in which the Master, previously seen in various male incarnations for over forty years, returned as a female. The Thirteenth Doctor also regenerated as a woman in "The Woman Who Fell to Earth".

Whether or not Time Lords can recognise each other across regenerations is not made entirely clear:
 In The War Games, the War Chief recognises the Second Doctor despite his regeneration and it is stated that they know each other when they first meet.
 In Terror of the Autons, the Third Doctor fails to recognise The Master's voice, when the Master speaks to him on a telephone.
 In The Three Doctors, the Second Doctor recognises the Third Doctor immediately, despite the fact that the Third Doctor is a future incarnation of himself. Omega is similarly able to recognise the two Doctors as the same man.
 In Planet of the Spiders, the Third Doctor has trouble recognising his former mentor.
 In The Deadly Assassin, Announcer Runcible, an old classmate, recognises the Fourth Doctor despite his changes in appearance and mentions that the Doctor appears to have had a "face lift" since they last met.
 In The Armageddon Factor, Drax, another alumnus immediately recognises the Fourth Doctor, though the Doctor does not recognise him.
 In The Five Doctors, the Third Doctor is unable to initially recognise the Master in his non-Gallifreyan body.
 In The Twin Dilemma, the Doctor's old friend Azmael fails to recognise him, as the Doctor has regenerated twice since their last encounter.
 In The Two Doctors, when the Sixth Doctor and Second Doctor first meet, they are initially quiet until they face each other and simultaneously yell at each other, each recognising immediately the other.
 In Survival, the Master recognises the Seventh Doctor on sight.
 In Doctor Who (1996), the Eighth Doctor is unable to recognise the Master while he possesses a human body, only recognising the Master when he corrects Grace's grammar.
 In "Utopia", the Tenth Doctor does not recognise the human form of the Master, although the Doctor did recognise him, and name him "Master", as soon as he recovered his Time Lord physiology and mind.
 In "The Sound of Drums", the Doctor states that Time Lords can "always" recognise each other, although, while on Earth, the Master used satellites with a telepathic network to mask his presence from the Doctor. The Doctor in this circumstance appears to only be referring to recognition of the individual as a Time Lord, not necessarily the specific identity. However, when he sees the Master on television, he recognises him.
 In "Time Crash", the Fifth Doctor could not instinctively recognise that the Tenth Doctor was a Time Lord, much less one of his own later incarnations.
 In "The Next Doctor", the Tenth Doctor initially seems unable to detect that the human Jackson Lake, who identifies himself as the Doctor, is not actually his regenerated future self.
 In "The End of Time", the Doctor immediately recognises an unidentified elderly female Time Lord on sight, and also refers to the lead Time Lord by the name Rassilon (an earlier incarnation of Rassilon had appeared in "The Five Doctors"). In the context of the story, however, he may have encountered both during the Time War, though he himself has regenerated since they last saw him. Rassilon and the woman recognised the Doctor on sight as well, but the Doctor's presence, regardless of incarnation, was expected.
 In "The Day of the Doctor", the War Doctor recognises neither the Tenth Doctor nor the Eleventh, initially assuming them to be future companions. Likewise, earlier on, when the Tenth and Eleventh Doctors first meet, the Tenth Doctor does not recognise his successor at first, but after the Eleventh Doctor's reaction upon seeing him, he is quick to realise who the Eleventh Doctor is.
 In "Dark Water", the Twelfth Doctor is unable to recognise the Master until she reveals her identity.
In "Spyfall", the Thirteenth Doctor is unable to recognize the Master until he tells her.

In "Turn Left", the Tenth Doctor is killed in his own rampage against the Racnoss without Donna to stop him and ultimately save his life. A UNIT soldier speculates that he died "too fast for him to regenerate". In "The Impossible Astronaut", a future version of the Eleventh Doctor is shot, causing him to begin his regeneration cycle. He is shot again before the regeneration completes, causing him to die instantly. However, in "The Wedding of River Song", it is revealed this was a shape shifting android the Doctor used to fake his death, making this questionable.

In cases of non-fatal injury, Time Lords who have recently regenerated can use left over cellular energy to heal and even regrow severed limbs, as seen in "The Christmas Invasion" where the Tenth Doctor regrows a hand. Also seen in "Journey's End", is the apparent ability to siphon off regeneration energy in order to cancel the effect of changing appearance; which requires them to have a "bio-matching receptacle" (in this case the Doctor's severed hand), which is usually impractical. However, this "non-regeneration" was revealed as "counting" towards the Doctor's twelve possible regenerations during the events of "The Time of the Doctor".

In "The End of Time", the Tenth Doctor was able to postpone his regeneration long enough so that he could travel in time and space to see his past companions for one last time before he regenerated. The Fifth Doctor also showed a similar ability in his final televised story The Caves of Androzani. Toward the end of episode 3 he is seen, apparently, fighting off the effects of an impending regeneration so he can return to Androzani Minor to save his companion Peri.

Time Lords appear to have the ability to stay conscious for moments after events that would outright kill other lifeforms instantly, giving them the opportunity to regenerate. In Logopolis, the Fourth Doctor falls hundreds of feet to the ground, yet is still conscious and able to talk to his companions when they find him minutes later before he regenerates. In The Caves of Androzani, the Fifth Doctor remains conscious throughout the entire course of his (eventually fatal) spectrox toxaemia, while his human companion Peri loses consciousness as the disease worsens. In "The Stolen Earth", the Tenth Doctor is shot by a Dalek's energy weapon, which has almost always been shown to instantly kill any other lifeform, yet is still conscious and able to return, with some assistance, to the TARDIS in order to regenerate. However, he was skimmed by the energy shot, while all others were shot in the middle of the back or in the chest, closer to vital organs. The Eleventh Doctor is also shot squarely by a weakened Dalek in "The Big Bang" and severely injured, but he manages to execute his plan to restart the universe nonetheless.

In Death of the Doctor (a 2010 The Sarah Jane Adventures serial), the Eleventh Doctor responds to a question from Clyde Langer by saying he can regenerate "507" times. Early news reports, before the episode was broadcast, suggested he would say there is no limit to the number of regenerations. Writer Russell T Davies stated in an interview with SFX that the line was not intended to be taken seriously and is instead a commentary. He said that the "thirteen lives" rule was too deeply entrenched in the viewer consciousness for his throwaway line to affect it. It is revealed in "The Time of the Doctor"  that this was in fact false and that due to his various regenerations, the Eleventh Doctor was in fact his last incarnation. However, the Time Lords intervened through a crack in time to grant him a full new regeneration cycle. The revelation in 2020's The Timeless Children that The Doctor is, in fact, not Gallifreyan and instead had their DNA used to give Gallifreyans the ability to regenerate, calls into doubt whether or not the Doctor does in fact have a limit to their regenerations, or if they merely believed they did due to all other Time Lords being limited.

Culture and society
The Time Lord homeworld, Gallifrey, is an Earth-like planet in the fictional constellation of Kasterborous. Its capital city is referred to as the Citadel, and contains the Capitol, the seat of Time Lord government. At the centre of the Capitol is the Panopticon, beneath which is the Eye of Harmony. Outside the Capitol lie wastelands where the "Outsiders", Time Lords who have dropped out of Time Lord society, live in less technologically advanced communities, shunning life in the cities as revealed in The Invasion of Time. The Doctor Who Roleplaying Game by FASA equates the Outsiders with the "Shobogans", a group mentioned briefly in The Deadly Assassin as being responsible for acts of vandalism around the Panopticon, but there is actually nothing on screen that explicitly connects the two. In "The Timeless Children" (2020), it is revealed that the Shobogans were the first race of peoples who resided on Gallifrey, only becoming the Time Lords after gene-splicing the ability to regenerate from the Doctor.

Romana and the Doctor have also referred to "Time Tots", or infant Time Lords, and (in "Smith and Jones") the Doctor refers his compatriots and he playing "with Röntgen bricks in the nursery". In "The Sound of Drums", the Master is seen as a child, apparently at the age of 8.

In general, the Time Lords are an aloof people, with a society full of pomp and ceremony. The Doctor has observed that his people "enjoy making speeches" and have an "infinite capacity for pretension". The Time Lord penchant for ceremony extends to their technology, with various artefacts given weighty names like the Hand of Omega, the Eye of Harmony and the Key of Rassilon. 

The Sixth Doctor has also characterised the Time Lords as a stagnant and corrupt society, a state caused by ten million years of absolute power.  Sutekh the Osiran decries them as "a perfidious species," while Brother Lassar, in the episode "School Reunion", describes the Time Lords as "a pompous race" of "ancient, dusty senators... frightened of change and chaos" and "peaceful to the point of indolence". Their portrayal in the series is reminiscent of academics living in ivory towers, unconcerned with external affairs. The Doctor states that the Time Lords were sworn never to interfere, only to watch. It has been suggested that, since perfecting the science of time travel, they have withdrawn, bound by the moral complexity of interfering in the natural flow of history; in Earthshock, the Cyberleader, when notified of the arrival of a TARDIS, is surprised at the presence of a Time Lord, stating "they are forbidden to interfere". In The Two Doctors, it is suggested  that Time Lords are responsible for maintaining a general balance of power between the races of the Universe.

While interference is apparently against Time Lord policy, there are occasions when they do intervene, albeit indirectly through their CIA or Celestial Intervention Agency. The CIA has occasionally sent the Doctor on missions that required plausible deniability, as in The Two Doctors, and sometimes against his will, as in Colony in Space and The Monster of Peladon. He is also sent on a mission in The Mutants  which was intended to help preserve the existence of a unique race, which was being destroyed by the excesses of the Earth empire. The Doctor's mission in Genesis of the Daleks even involves changing history to avert the creation of the Daleks, or at least temper their aggressiveness.

Children of Gallifrey are taken from their families at the age of 8 and admitted into the Academy. Novices are then taken to an initiation ceremony before the Untempered Schism, a gap in the fabric of reality that looks into the time vortex. Of those that stare into it, some are inspired, some run away and others go mad. The Doctor suggests that the Master went mad, while admitting that he ran away.

Each Time Lord belongs to one of a number of various colleges or chapters, such as the Patrexes, Arcalian, and the Prydonian chapters, which have ceremonial and possibly political significance. In The Deadly Assassin, it is explained that each chapter has its own colours; the Prydonians wear scarlet and orange, the Arcalians wear green, and the Patrexeans wear heliotrope. However, in that same serial, Cardinal Borusa, described as "the leader of the Prydonian chapter", wears heliotrope. Other Prydonians wear orange headdresses with orange-brown (not scarlet) robes. Other chapters mentioned in spin-off novels  include the Dromeian and Cerulean chapters. The Prydonian chapter has a reputation for being devious, and tends to produce renegades; the Doctor, the Master and the Rani are all Prydonians.  The colleges of the Academy are led by the Cardinals. Ushers, who provide security and assistance at official Time Lord functions, may belong to any chapter, and wear all-gold uniforms. Also mentioned in The Deadly Assassin are 'plebeian classes'.

The executive political leadership is split between the Lord President, who keeps the ceremonial relics of the Time Lords, and the Chancellor, who appears to be the administrative leader of the Cardinals and who acts as a check on the power of the Lord President. The President is an elected position; on Presidential Resignation Day, the outgoing President usually names his successor, who is then usually confirmed in a non-contested "election", but it is still constitutionally possible for another candidate to put themselves forward for the post, as the Doctor did in The Deadly Assassin. In that story, the Presidency was described as a largely ceremonial role, but in The Invasion of Time the orders of the office were to be obeyed without question. In the event the current Lord President is unable to name a successor, the council can appoint a President to take his place. In The Five Doctors, the council appoints the Doctor as president after Borusa is imprisoned by Rassilon, and later deposed him after he neglected his duties.

The President and Chancellor also sit on the Time Lord High Council, akin to a legislative body, composed variously of Councillors and more senior Cardinals. Also on the High Council is the Castellan of the Chancellery Guard, in charge of the security of the Citadel, whom the Doctor has referred to as the leader of a trumped-up palace guard. According to the constitution, if while in emergency session the other members of the High Council are in unanimous agreement, even the President's orders can be overruled.

Technology
The Moment was claimed by the Time Lords to be the most powerful weapon in the Universe and capable of destroying entire galaxies. The Moment was locked in Gallifrey's Time Vaults, specifically in the Omega Arsenal. The Moment is so powerful that the weapon's operating system became sentient, leading the Time Lords to wonder "How do you use a weapon when it can stand in judgement of you?" and that "only one man would be mad enough to try it". In the 50th anniversary special "The Day of the Doctor", the War Doctor breaks into the Omega Arsenal, steals the Moment and is about to destroy both Time Lords and Daleks alike to stop the Time War before the Moment engineers a meeting with his succeeding regenerations to convince him otherwise.

Another impressive example of Time Lord technology is the Eye of Harmony, a repurposed black hole singularity contained within the instrumentality below the Panopticon. This is the source of their power and the anchor of the Web of Time itself, created by Rassilon and the co-founders of Time Lord society in the distant past.  The Time Lords were accomplished stellar engineers and could control the development of stars with devices like the Hand of Omega, which was shown to be capable of forcing a star to go supernova.  The Eye of Harmony exists within the Doctor's TARDIS as a collapsing star suspended in a permanent state of decay, hence harnessing the potential energy of a collapse that would never occur. Whether these are all aspects of the Eye of Harmony on Gallifrey or individual stars in their own right is not made clear on screen. 

Paradoxically, although the Time Lords are a scientifically and technologically advanced race, the civilisation is so old that key pieces of their technology have become shrouded in legend and myth.  In the spin-off fiction,  an edict and general aversion against exploring Gallifrey's past also contributes to this. Accordingly, until the Master rediscovers it, the Time Lords forgot that the location of the Eye of Harmony is beneath their capital.  They also treated such ceremonial symbols as the Key and Sash of Rassilon as mere historical curiosities, being unaware of their true function. 

In the revived series, there were instances in which evil alien species have stolen Time Lord technology for their own purposes but such is its complexity that they are unable to operate it, as illustrated in "Doomsday" when the Genesis Ark was stolen by the Daleks and even they could not open it. Furthermore, the Genesis Ark was just one Time Lord prison that held millions of Daleks, demonstrating "bigger on the inside than it is on the outside" Time Lord technology. The classic series also makes reference to the inability of other races to successfully use Time Lord technology, with The Two Doctors  stating that even if a race managed to copy and build their own TARDISes, they would be ripped apart by the molecular stresses of time travel as all TARDISes have a fail-deadly approach to unauthorised use unless primed with a Rassilon Imprimatur, creating a symbiotic link to a specific Time Lord.

The great defence system of Gallifrey is a quantum forcefield known as the Transduction Barrier, a perfect defence shield preventing all matter and energy, even TARDISes, from passing through without authorisation.  The Time Lords are further protected by phasing the entire region around Gallifrey into a temporal domain known as Inner Time, effectively separating the homeworld from interaction with the rest of the Universe.  During the final hours of the Time War, the High Council of Gallifrey refer to defenses called 'Sky Trenches' which appear to be at least somewhat effective against invading Daleks and/or their ships, as seen in "The Day of the Doctor".

TARDISes are characterised not just by their ability to travel in time, but also their dimensionally transcendent nature. A TARDIS' interior spaces exist in a different dimension from its exterior, allowing it to appear to be bigger on the inside. The Doctor states that transdimensional engineering was a key Time Lord discovery in The Robots of Death. In the Ninth and Tenth Doctors' episodes, the TARDIS has an organic look, and the Doctor states in "The Impossible Planet"  that TARDISes are grown, not made. It is seen in "The Name of the Doctor"  that as a TARDIS dies, its 'dimension dams' can break down causing a 'size leak' wherein the exterior dimensions of a TARDIS begin to expand to match its inner dimensions.

Fitting their generally defensive nature, Time Lord weapons technology is rarely seen, other than the staser hand weapons used by the Guard within the Capitol.

Standard TARDISes do not generally seem to use any on-board weaponry, although War or Battle TARDISes (armed with "time torpedoes" that freeze their target in time) have appeared in the spin-off media.  In the novels,  the Eighth Doctor's companion Compassion, a living TARDIS, has enough firepower to annihilate other TARDISes. In the serial Castrovalva, the Master's TARDIS is equipped with an energy field that he uses to temporarily disable or stun several human security guards outside the vessel.

One exception to the Time Lords' defensive weaponry is the de-mat gun (or dematerialisation gun). The de-mat gun is a weapon of mass destruction that removes its target from space-time altogether, as seen in The Invasion of Time. The de-mat gun was created in Rassilon's time and is a closely guarded secret; the knowledge to create one is kept in the Matrix and is available only to the President. To make sure this knowledge is not abused, the only way to arm a de-mat gun is by means of the Great Key of Rassilon, whose location is only known to the Chancellor. As a means of extreme sanction, the Time Lords have also been known to place whole planets into time-loops, isolating them from the universe in one repeating moment of time  as well as hurling planets from one galaxy to another using a weapon referred only as a magnetron in The Trial of a Time Lord.

In the Eighth Doctor Adventures novel The Ancestor Cell by Peter Anghelides and Stephen Cole, the Time Lords are shown to house other weapons of mass destruction in a stable time eddy known as the Slaughterhouse. In the Doctor Who Annual 2006, a section by Russell T Davies says that during the Time War, the Time Lords used Bowships (used against the Great Vampires in an ancient war), Black Hole Carriers and N-Forms (war machines first mentioned in the Virgin New Adventures novel Damaged Goods, written by Davies).

In "The End of Time", Rassilon is shown wearing a gauntlet with several powers, primarily the ability to disintegrate a target and the ability to reverse changes made to the human race by the Master. When Rassilon throws the white point star into the hologram of the Earth, the diamond is able to arrive at the planet by following the Master's signal, travelling through the time-locked war to the post-war universe.

Gallifreyan paintings were unique in that they were in 3D, as they acted as snapshots of a single moment in time by use of stasis cubes. This meant that they could be used as rudimentary time travel, by freezing a person inside a painting and then letting them out at the required point in time. An example of this is Gallifrey Falls No More as seen in "The Day of the Doctor".

History

Details of the Time Lords' history within the show are sketchy and are fraught with supposition and contradiction. The series 12 finale "The Timeless Children" (2020) reveals the Time Lords were originally members of the Shobogan race who were genetically altered with the genetic code of "The Timeless Child", a being that later came to be as the Doctor. The Time Lords became the masters of time travel when one of their number, the scientist Omega, created an energy source to power their experiments in time. To this end, Omega used a stellar manipulation device, the Hand of Omega, to rework a nearby star into a new form to serve that source. Unfortunately, the star flared, first into a supernova, and then collapsed into a black hole. Omega was thought killed in that explosion but unknown to everyone, had somehow survived in an anti-matter universe beyond the black hole's singularity.  Rassilon, the ultimate founder of Time Lord society, then took a singularity (assumed by fans and the spin-off media  to be the same one as Omega's) and placed it beneath the Time Lords' citadel on Gallifrey. This perfectly balanced Eye of Harmony then served as the power source for their civilisation as well as their time machines.

At some point in their history the Time Lords interacted with the civilisation of the planet Minyos, giving them advanced technology (including the ability to "regenerate" to a limited degree, by rejuvenating their bodies when they grow too old). This met with disastrous results, (which is said to be the reason the Time Lords adopted a philosophy of "non-interference"). The Minyans destroyed themselves in a series of nuclear wars.

In "Dalek" (2005), the Ninth Doctor explains that his people perished along with the Dalek race in the "Last Great Time War", leaving the Doctor the last of his race. In "The Satan Pit" (2006), the Beast identifies the Tenth Doctor as "[t]he killer of his own kind." In "The Sound of Drums" (2007), the Master reveals he escaped the war by turning himself into a human following the Dalek Emperor taking control of the Cruciform. In "The End of Time" (2009–10), the Time Lords, after attempting to break out the time lock of the Time War and become creatures of consciousness, are shown being sent back into the War on the last day through the Tenth Doctor's intervention. The Master also disappears along with them. Rassilon describes Time Lord history in this story as having lasted "a billion years" up until the end of the Time War.

In "The Day of the Doctor" (2013), thirteen incarnations of the Doctor are shown successfully attempting to freeze the Time Lords and their home world of Gallifrey in time, by transporting them to a "parallel pocket universe" using their TARDISes. Because the time streams are out of sync, the Doctor does not retain the memory of this until his eleventh incarnation. Indeed, earlier on in the episode, both the Tenth and the Eleventh Doctors mistakenly believe that the War Doctor killed all of the Time Lords on the last day of the Time War. While the plan is being outlined, the War Doctor notes that to the rest of the universe, it only appears as if the Time Lords and Daleks had mutually destroyed each other, when in fact, the Daleks had fired upon themselves in the crossfire after Gallifrey vanished, ending in the destruction of most of their own race, but not the Time Lords. In "Death in Heaven" (2014), the Master, now regenerated into a female form called "Missy", explains that when the Doctor saved Gallifrey, this caused the Doctor to save her as well. She bluffs the Twelfth Doctor into thinking that Gallifrey has returned to its original co-ordinates, but when the Doctor goes looking, he finds nothing there.

In "Face the Raven" (2015), the immortal Ashildr makes a deal to have the Doctor's TARDIS keys and confession dial taken and to teleport the Twelfth Doctor away in exchange for her trap street's safety. In "Heaven Sent" (2015), the Twelfth Doctor escapes his confession dial and finds himself near the Citadel on Gallifrey. He tells a young child to inform the Time Lords that he knows what they have done and that he has returned "the long way around". He then tells the Time Lords through his confession dial the hybrid they fear "is me". In "Hell Bent" (2015), Gallifrey is revealed to have come back from the pocket universe it was frozen in and exist at the end of the universe. Rassilon is revealed to have been the one who had the Doctor teleported into the confession dial.

In "Spyfall" (2020), the Master reveals that he returned to Gallifrey, slaughtered the population and devastated the planet in his rage over discovering the truth about the Time Lords’ origins and the identity of the Timeless Child. Later, in "The Timeless Children" (2020), the Master lures the Thirteenth Doctor back to Gallifrey, opening a path for the Cybermen to invade and convert the bodies of deceased Time Lords to create CyberMasters - a subrace of Cybermen capable of regeneration. The Doctor, after being shown the truth about their past, plants an explosive in the Citadel, seemingly destroying the CyberMasters and the Master while rendering Gallifrey devoid of any organic life.

See also
List of actors who have played the Doctor
Time War (Doctor Who)

Notes

References

Bibliography

External links

 
Fictional telepaths
Fictional civilizations
Fictional endangered and extinct species